The 24th Emmy Awards, later known as the 24th Primetime Emmy Awards, were handed out on May 6, 1972.  The ceremony was hosted by Johnny Carson.  Winners are listed in bold and series' networks are in parentheses.

The top shows of the night were All in the Family and Elizabeth R. All in the Family set numerous records during the night, it became the first show to win six major awards, (although one came in a tie, this record would be broken by other shows that won six major awards outright). It also became the first non-anthology drama to receive at least ten major nominations.

A milestone was set when All in the Family and Columbo each received every nomination in a major category, both for writing. This feat has become extremely rare as the field of nominees expanded to five and later six.

Glenda Jackson also made history by receiving three acting nominations for the same performance as Queen Elizabeth I in Elizabeth R.  Rule changes have made this impossible in later ceremonies. In addition, by beating the Big Three TV networks, this was PBS' first win for Outstanding Drama. (Though the N.E.T. network was the first to win this award, against the Big Three, in 1969, NET would eventually dissolve, but would become the direct predecessor to PBS.)  This show was also the first non-American made show to win this award.

Winners and nominees
Source:
Note: Winners are listed in bold type.

Programs

{| class="wikitable" width="100%"
|-
! width="50%"| Outstanding Series – Comedy
! width="50%"| Outstanding Series – Drama
|-
| valign="top" |
 All in the Family (CBS)
 Mary Tyler Moore (CBS)
 The Odd Couple (ABC)
 Sanford and Son (NBC)
| valign="top" |
Elizabeth R (PBS)
 Columbo (NBC)
 Mannix (CBS)
 Marcus Welby M.D. (ABC)
 The Six Wives of Henry VIII (CBS)
|-
! width="50%" | Outstanding Variety Series – Musical
! width="50%" | Outstanding Variety Series – Talk
|-
| valign="top" |
The Carol Burnett Show (CBS)
 The Dean Martin Comedy Hour (NBC)
 The Flip Wilson Show (NBC)
 The Sonny & Cher Comedy Hour (CBS)
| valign="top" |
 The Dick Cavett Show (ABC)
 The David Frost Show (Syndicated)
 The Tonight Show Starring Johnny Carson (NBC)
|-
! width="50%"| Outstanding Single Program – Variety or Musical – Variety and Popular Music
! width="50%"| Outstanding Single Program – Variety or Musical – Classical Music
|-
| valign="top" |
'S Wonderful 'S Marvelous 'S Gershwin (NBC)
 The Flip Wilson Show (NBC)
 The Sonny & Cher Comedy Hour (CBS)
 Julie and Carol at Lincoln Center (CBS)
| valign="top" |
Bernstein on Beethoven: A Celebration in Vienna (CBS)
 Heifetz (NBC)
 The Peking Ballet: First Spectacular from China (NBC)
 The Trial of Mary Lincoln (PBS)
|-
! width="50%"| Outstanding Achievement in Daytime Drama – Programs
! width="50%"| Outstanding Achievement in Children's Programming – Programs
|-
| valign="top" |
The Doctors (NBC)
 General Hospital (ABC)
| valign="top" |
'Sesame Street (PBS)
 The Electric Company (PBS)
|-
! width="50%"| Outstanding Achievement in Sports Programming
! width="50%"| Outstanding Single Program - Drama or Comedy
|-
| valign="top" |ABC's Wide World of Sports (ABC)
 1971 AFC Championship Game (NBC)
 NFL Monday Night Football (ABC)
 XI Olympic Winter Games (NBC)
 1972 Rose Bowl (NBC)
 1971 World Series (NBC)
| valign="top" |Brian's Song (ABC)
 All in the Family (Episode: "Sammy's Visit") (CBS)
 Elizabeth R (Episode: "The Lion's Cub") (PBS)
 Hallmark Hall of Fame (Episode: "The Snow Goose") (NBC)
 The Six Wives of Henry VIII (Episode: "Jane Seymour") (CBS)
|-
! width="50%"| Outstanding New Series
| style="background:#FFF; border-bottom:1px solid #FFF; border-right:1px solid #FFF"|
|-
| valign="top" |Elizabeth R (PBS)
 Columbo (NBC)
 Sanford and Son (NBC)
 The Six Wives of Henry VIII (PBS)
 The Sonny & Cher Comedy Hour (CBS)
| style="background:#FFF; border-top:1px solid #FFF; border-bottom:1px solid #FFF; border-right:1px solid #FFF"|
|}

Acting

Lead performances

Supporting performances

Single performances

Directing

Writing

Most major nominations
By network 
 CBS – 47
 NBC – 38
 ABC – 21
 PBS – 11

 By program
 All in the Family (CBS) – 10
 Mary Tyler Moore (CBS) – 8
 Columbo (NBC) – 7
 Brian's Song (ABC) / Elizabeth R (PBS) – 6
 Hallmark Hall of Fame (NBC) / The Six Wives of Henry VIII (CBS) – 5

Most major awards
By network 
 CBS – 14
 NBC – 8
 PBS – 6
 ABC – 5

 By program
 All in the Family (CBS) – 6
 Elizabeth R (PBS) – 4
 Brian's Song'' (ABC) – 3

Notes

References

External links
 Emmys.com list of 1972 Nominees & Winners
 

024
Primetime Emmy Awards
1972 in Los Angeles
May 1972 events in the United States